USS Kittaton (YT-406 /YTB-406 /YTM-406) was a Sassaba-class district harbor tug that served the U.S. Navy at the end of World War II. She served in the Pacific Ocean, often in the Japan and Philippine Islands area and was eventually struck from the Navy list at an unspecified date.

Built in Brooklyn, New York
Kittaton (YTB-406) was laid down as YT-406; re-classified YTB-406 on 15 May 1944; launched 30 June 1944, by Ira Bushey & Sons, Inc., Brooklyn, New York; and placed in service 19 January 1945.

World War II-related service
Assigned to duty in the Pacific Ocean theatre of operations, Kittaton joined Task Force 16 at Pearl Harbor 21 May. Departing 2 days later, she steamed via Kwajalein and arrived Guam in June for towing operations out of Apra Harbor.

Post-war service
Kittaton served at Guam and in the western Pacific until February 1947 when she was assigned to further duty with Service Force, Pacific Fleet. Reclassified YTM-406 in February 1962, Kittaton in 1967 remained on active service with the U.S. Pacific Fleet out of U.S. Naval Base Subic Bay, Philippine Islands.

Deactivation
Kittaton was decommissioned and struck by the Navy at an undisclosed date. She was sold for scrapping on 23 April 1987.

Honors and awards
Qualified Kittaton personnel are eligible for the following:
 American Campaign Medal
 Asiatic-Pacific Campaign Medal
 World War II Victory Medal
 National Defense Service Medal

References

  
 NavSource Online: Service Ship Photo Archive - YT-406 / YTB-406 / YTM-406 Kittaton

Ships built in Brooklyn
World War II auxiliary ships of the United States
Sassaba-class tugs
1944 ships